True Democracy is an album by the reggae band Steel Pulse, released in 1982.

The album peaked at No. 120 on the Billboard 200.

Production
When the band started work on the album, they had no record deal. While on tour in New York in 1981 they met Karl Pitterson, with whom they recorded five demos. While the demos didn't prompt any offers from major labels, a small Danish label offered their studios to record an album.

The album was recorded over 25 days at Feedback Studios in Aarhus, with Pitterson producing.

The album was eventually picked up by Elektra Records.

Critical receptionThe Washington Post called True Democracy "a cheerful album, almost buoyant in its musical exhortations to dance even as its lyrics tackle less-than-merry topics."Style Weekly'', in 2018, called it "still ... one of the most danceable political albums ever."

Track listing
All tracks written by David Hinds, except where noted.

"Chant A Psalm" – 4:30
"Ravers" – 3:56
"Find It...Quick!" – 3:26
"A Who Responsible?" – 3:54
"Worth His Weight In Gold (Rally Round)" – 4:35
"Leggo Beast" – 3:44
"Blues Dance Raid" – 4:53
"Your House" – 3:42
"Man No Sober" – 4:29
"Dub Marcus Say" (Phonso Martin) – 4:41

Bonus tracks for CD
"Ravers [12" Version]" - 5:56
"Leggo Beast [12" Version]" - 6:40
"Your House [Dub Version]" - 3:50
"A Who Responsible? [Dub Version]" - 4:00

Personnel
Steel Pulse
Ronald "Stepper" McQueen - bass
Steve "Grizzly" Nesbitt - drums
Selwyn "Bumbo" Brown - keyboard, vocals
Alphonso Martin - percussion, vocals
David Hinds - guitar, vocals
Basil Gabbidon - lead guitar
Technical
Cover Concept - Steel Pulse
Art Direction - Ron Coro
Design - Kathy Morphesis
Photography - Eric Watson

References

Steel Pulse albums
1982 albums
Elektra Records albums